Jaime González may refer to:
 Jaime González (sport shooter) (1933–2011), Spanish shooter
 Jaime González (Colombian footballer) (1938–1985), Colombian footballer
 Jaime Gonzalez (golfer) (born 1954), Brazilian golfer
 Jaime González Durán (born 1971), Mexican drug trafficker
 Jaime González (Chilean footballer) (born 1977), Chilean footballer

See also
 Jaime González Airport in Cuba